"Calm After the Storm" is a 2014 song by Dutch duo The Common Linnets. It was chosen to represent the Netherlands at the Eurovision Song Contest 2014 in Denmark.

Calm after the Storm may also refer to:
La quiete dopo la tempesta ("The quiet after the storm") poem by Giacomo Leopardi
Calm After the Storm (EP), by Helsinki
"Calm After the Storm", song by The Autumn Offering from 2004  album Revelations of the Unsung